The 1942 Tennessee gubernatorial election was held on November 3, 1942. Incumbent Democrat Prentice Cooper defeated Republican nominee C. N. Frazier with 70.15% of the vote.

Primary elections
Primary elections were held on August 6, 1942.

Democratic primary

Candidates
Prentice Cooper, incumbent Governor
John Ridley Mitchell, former U.S. Representative
J. Bailey Wray

Results

General election

Candidates
Prentice Cooper, Democratic
C. N. Frazier, Republican

Results

References

1942
Tennessee
Gubernatorial